Sir William Handcock (11 September 1654 – September 1701) was an Irish politician and judge.

Born in County Westmeath, he was the second son of William Handcock and his wife Abigail, daughter of Sir Thomas Stanley and Mary Hammond, and sister of Thomas Stanley. His older brother was Thomas Handcock. He was educated at Trinity College, Dublin.

Handcock entered the Irish House of Commons in 1692, representing Boyle until the following year. He sat for Dublin City from 1695 until 1699. Handcock was appointed Recorder of Dublin in 1695, a post he held until his death in 1701.

On 31 May 1685, he married Elizabeth Coddington, daughter of Nicholas Coddington and Elizabeth Dixie. They had at least three  children, John, the only son and heir, Anne, who married Patrick Wemyss MP, and Abigail, who married Edward Griffith, and was the ancestor of Sir Richard Griffith, 1st Baronet.

References

1654 births
1701 deaths
Alumni of Trinity College Dublin
Irish MPs 1692–1693
Irish MPs 1695–1699
Members of the Parliament of Ireland (pre-1801) for County Roscommon constituencies
Recorders of Dublin
Members of the Parliament of Ireland (pre-1801) for County Dublin constituencies